4th Degree Burn is the first album by rock band Slapshock, released in 1999.

It was certified platinum in the Philippines.

Track listing

Personnel 
Vladimir "Jamir" Garcia  – vocals
Lee Nadela – bass
Leandro Ansing – guitar
Jerry Basco – guitar
Richard Phaul "Chi" Evora – drums

Additional Musician
Reg Rubio - Guest Vocals (track 6)
Cecile Robledo - Guest Vocals (track 7)
Ian Tayao - Guest Vocals (track 12)

Album Credits 
Executive Producer: Chito R. Ilacad
Supervising Producer: Francis Guevarra
Sound Engineer: Angee Rozul
Album Cover & Lay out Design: Rom Villaseran
Additional Live Photo: Kathy Chua
Clown Remix: Ferq Foundation

References 

Slapshock albums
1999 debut albums